Touzac is a commune in the Lot department in south-western France.

Situated in a bend of the river Lot, many of its buildings date from the 1840s and 1850s and were constructed in a wave of economic development that followed the opening of the metallurgical factory in nearby Fumel. Today, after the factory in Fumel has seen most of its operations moved to Spain in the 1970s and 1980s (a loss of some 3500 jobs) and after the decline of agriculture, Touzac, like many other villages in the area, has become a tourist destination.

One of its attractions is La source bleue, a blue spring near the river. Next to the spring is a water mill, and the domaine is now a hotel and restaurant named for the spring. Marguerite Moreno lived here during World War II.

Population
1793: 461
1800: 830
1821: 829
1831: 1028
1836: 972
1841: 457
1846: 446
1851: 459
1856: 445
1861: 435
1866: 423
1872: 417
1876: 428
1881: 414
1886: 414
1891: 404
1896: 383
1901: 353
1906: 334
1911: 338
1921: 279
1926: 274
1931: 293
1936: 274
1946: 290
1962: 376
1968: 406
1975: 382
1982: 417
1990: 412
1999: 341
2006: 345
2008: 351
2011: 359

Notable people

Marguerite Moreno, actress, died in Touzac in 1948

See also
Communes of the Lot department

References

Communes of Lot (department)